The 1970 Colorado gubernatorial election was held on November 3, 1970. Incumbent Republican John Arthur Love defeated Democratic nominee Mark Anthony Hogan with 52.46% of the vote. This would be the last time until 1998 that Colorado elected a Republican as Governor and also the last time Denver County, Boulder County, and San Miguel County voted for the Republican candidate.

Primary elections
Primary elections were held on September 8, 1970.

Democratic primary

Candidates
Mark Anthony Hogan, incumbent Lieutenant Governor

Results

Republican primary

Candidates
John Arthur Love, incumbent Governor

Results

General election

Candidates
Major party candidates
John Arthur Love, Republican 
Mark Anthony Hogan, Democratic

Other candidates
Albert Gurule, La Raza Unida
Walter R. Plankinton, American Independent
James Lauderdale, Socialist Workers

Results

General overview

Results by county

References

1970
Colorado
Gubernatorial